The  was a professional golf tournament on the Japan Golf Tour from 2008 to 2012. It was played in October at the Totsuka Country Club in Totsuka-ku, Yokohama, Kanagawa and sponsored by Canon.

Winners

Notes

External links
Coverage on the Japan Golf Tour's official site

Former Japan Golf Tour events
Defunct golf tournaments in Japan
Sport in Yokohama
Recurring sporting events established in 2008
Recurring sporting events disestablished in 2012
2008 establishments in Japan
2012 disestablishments in Japan
Canon Inc.